Xavier Marchand (born 4 August 1973 in Deauville) is a former medley swimmer from France, who competed at two consecutive Summer Olympics for his native country, starting in 1996 in Atlanta, Georgia. He won his first international medal (silver) in 1997, at the 1997 European Aquatics Championships in the 200 m individual medley behind the Netherlands' Marcel Wouda. Swimmer Léon Marchand is his son.

References

1973 births
Living people
People from Deauville
French male medley swimmers
Olympic swimmers of France
Swimmers at the 1996 Summer Olympics
Swimmers at the 2000 Summer Olympics
World Aquatics Championships medalists in swimming
European Aquatics Championships medalists in swimming
Mediterranean Games gold medalists for France
Swimmers at the 1997 Mediterranean Games
Sportspeople from Calvados (department)
Mediterranean Games medalists in swimming
20th-century French people
21st-century French people